Unfamiliar Fishes is a nonfiction book by This American Life contributor Sarah Vowell, first published in 2011 in print and audiobook versions.

Synopsis
The book takes a humorous tone and examines the fulfillment of American imperialist manifest destiny at the end of the 19th century as America annexed Hawaii, Puerto Rico, and Guam, and invaded Cuba, and the Philippines in 1898, in an attempt to become a global power. Vowell then tells the story of the culture clash that ensued following Christian missionaries who then moved in swiftly to try to convert the laid back native Hawaiians to the American way. The title comes from a reference of David Malo.

Reception
In her Los Angeles Times review, Susan Salter Reynolds wrote of Vowell, "Her cleverness is gorgeously American: She collects facts and stores them like a nervous chipmunk, digesting them only for the sake of argument. Her curiosity is fueled by indignation. She insists, like a good empiricist, on seeing the people and places she writes about. She is the queen of that great American institution: the road trip."

By contrast, Michiko Kakutani in The New York Times is unimpressed, condemning Vowell's self-indulgent style: "Certainly at a time when ignorance and historical illiteracy are rampant, there is a place for books that make the past relevant and easy to digest for the casual reader. But Ms. Vowell's determination to render history user-friendly often feels reductive and condescending, and her contemporary analogies can be strained."

However, in the New York Times Book Review, Hawaii resident Kaui Hart Hemmings praised the author thus: "Vowell deftly summarizes complex events and significant upheavals, reducing them to their essence. ... While Vowell's take on Hawaii's Americanization is abbreviated, it's never bereft of substance—her repartee manages to be filling, her insights astute and comprehensive. It's not surprising to learn that she spent significant time interacting with islanders and combing through journals and archives. A variety of voices are heard, and all sides are implicated in the old Hawaii's demise."

Although Dan Kois, writing for National Public Radio, felt that Vowell was "good at connecting the dots in ways that make history vivid for her readers," he found the book "glib" and the subject "so complicated that her anecdotal structure isn't quite up to the task." He also cited "the limitations of Vowell's arch style."

Audiobook
An unabridged audiobook was released by Simon & Schuster on March 22, 2011. It contained a large cast of readers, and music was performed by Michael Giacchino and Grant-Lee Phillips. The cast was:

Fred Armisen as David Kalākaua, Henry Obookiah, and George Vancouver
Bill Hader as Rufus Anderson, Captain James Cook, Robert Dampier, Sanford Dole, and Walter Murray Gibson
John Hodgman as Amos Cooke and Teddy Roosevelt
Catherine Keener as Lucy Goodale Thurston
Edward Norton as Hiram Bingham and Grover Cleveland
Keanu Reeves as David Malo
Paul Rudd as Lorrin Thurston
Maya Rudolph as Sybil Bingham and Queen Liluokalani
John Slattery as Levi Chamberlain, Henry Cabot Lodge, and Ernest Hemingway

References

External links
Book discussion on Unfamiliar Fishes, C-SPAN, April 2, 2011
Book discussion on Unfamiliar Fishes, C-SPAN, September 24, 2011

2011 non-fiction books
Books by Sarah Vowell
Social history of Hawaii
Riverhead Books books